VA247 may refer to:
 Ariane flight VA247, an Ariane 5 launch that occurred on 5 February 2019
 Virgin Australia flight 247, with IATA flight number VA247
 Virginia State Route 247 (VA-247), a primary state highway in the United States